Toms Dam Branch is a  long 2nd tributary to Gum Branch in Sussex County, Delaware.  This is the only stream of this name in the United States.

Variant names
According to the Geographic Names Information System, it has also been known historically as:
Saint Johnstown Ditch

Course
Toms Dam Branch rises about 0.5 miles south of Staytonville, Delaware and then flows south to join Gum Branch about 2 miles east-northeast of Bridgeville.

Watershed
Toms Dam Branch drains  of area, receives about 45.7 in/year of precipitation, has a topographic wetness index of 742.48 and is about 10% forested.

See also
List of Delaware rivers

References

Rivers of Delaware
Rivers of Sussex County, Delaware
Tributaries of the Nanticoke River